Kelvin Mubanga Kampamba (born 24 November 1996) is a Zambian footballer who plays as a midfielder for ZESCO United F.C. and the Zambia national team.

Career

International

International Goals
Scores and results list Zambia's goal tally first.

References

External links
Profile at Football Database

1996 births
Living people
Nkana F.C. players
Power Dynamos F.C. players
Zambian footballers
Zambia international footballers
Association football midfielders
Zambia Super League players
ZESCO United F.C. players
Zambia A' international footballers
2020 African Nations Championship players